Ahu Qaleh (also Romanized as Āhū Qal‘eh; also known as Āhū Qal‘ehsī, Āy Qal‘eh, and Āy Qal‘ehsī) is a village in Hir Rural District, Hir District, Ardabil County, Ardabil Province, Iran. At the 2006 census, its population was 103, in 24 families.

References 

Towns and villages in Ardabil County